Austin Stone Bergner (born May 1, 1997) is an American professional  baseball pitcher in the Detroit Tigers organization. He previously played college baseball for the North Carolina Tar Heels.

Career

Amateur career 
Bergner initially attended West Orange High School in Winter Garden, Florida, where he started receiving national attention as a sophomore. He represented the United States U18 team that won a gold medal at the 2014 COPABE Pan American Championships in Mexico. In a game against Cuba, he was brought in to close out the game in the ninth inning, earning the save in a 5–4 win. He subsequently represented Team USA at the 2015 WBSC U-18 Baseball World Cup in Japan, where they also won gold. In their opening game against the Czech Republic, he struck out nine batters in six innings to lead USA to an 11–1 mercy rule win. He transferred to Windermere Prep in 2015, the summer before his junior year. That season, he had a 6–1 win–loss record and 0.40 earned run average (ERA) in 52.2 innings pitched. Sports Illustrated named him the #3 high school pitcher in the nation from the class of 2016, and USA Today selected him as the #14 most promising prospect in his class. After his senior year, he was drafted by the Boston Red Sox in the 38th round of the 2016 MLB draft, but he did not sign, and instead chose to attend the University of North Carolina to play college baseball. In 2017 and 2018, he played collegiate summer baseball with the Chatham Anglers of the Cape Cod Baseball League.

Bergner throws a fastball between 90–93 miles per hour (144–149 km/h), a curveball and a changeup.

Professional career
Bergner was drafted by the Detroit Tigers in the 9th round of the 2019 MLB draft.

References

External links

Living people
1997 births
American people of Colombian descent
People from Windermere, Florida
Baseball players from Florida
Baseball pitchers
North Carolina Tar Heels baseball players
Chatham Anglers players
Gulf Coast Tigers players
Connecticut Tigers players